The Commission to Investigate Alleged Police Corruption (known informally as the Knapp Commission, after its chairman Whitman Knapp) was a five-member panel initially formed in April 1970 by Mayor John V. Lindsay to investigate corruption within the New York City Police Department. The creation of the commission was largely a result of the publicity generated by the public revelations of police corruption made by Patrolman Frank Serpico and Sergeant David Durk. The commission concluded that the NYPD had systematic corruption problems, confirming the existence of widespread corruption and made a number of recommendations.

Members
In 1970, Mayor Lindsay appointed five members to serve on the Knapp Commission:
 Whitman Knapp, chair
 Arnold Bauman (later replaced by John E. Sprizzo)
 Joseph Monserrat
 Franklin A. Thomas
 Cyrus Vance

Investigation and public hearings
While the Knapp Commission began its investigation of corruption in the police department in June 1970, public hearings did not start until October 18, 1971. In addition to the testimony of "lamplighters" (whistleblowers) Serpico and Durk, testimony from dozens of other witnesses, including former Police Commissioner Howard R. Leary, corrupt patrolmen, and the victims of police shakedowns, was heard.

From 1970 to 1972, Michael F. Armstrong was chief counsel to the Knapp Commission. Nicholas Scoppetta served as associate counsel.

As an immediate result of the testimony of the witnesses, criminal indictments against corrupt police officials were handed down. Commissioner Patrick V. Murphy was appointed by Mayor Lindsay shortly after the commission was formed to clean up the department, implement proactive integrity checks, transfer senior personnel on a huge scale, rotate critical jobs, ensure sufficient funds to pay informants, and crack down on citizen attempts at bribery.

On June 15, 1972, Whitman Knapp, Chairman of the Knapp Commission, was nominated as a federal judge for the Southern District of New York by President Richard M. Nixon.

Recommendations
The commission issued its preliminary report on August 15, 1972, and issued its final report on December 27, 1972. In its final report, the commission found widespread corruption in the New York City Police Department, and made the following recommendations:

 commanders should be held accountable for their subordinates' actions.
 commanders should file periodic reports on key aspects that would breed corruption. 
 field offices of the Internal Affairs division should be created at all precincts. 
 undercover informants should be placed in all precincts.
 improve screening and selection methods and standards.
 a change in police attitudes.

"Grass Eaters" and "Meat Eaters"
The Knapp Commission Report on Police Corruption identified two particular classes of corrupt police officer, which it called "Grass Eaters" and "Meat Eaters". This classification refers to petty corruption under peer pressure ("eating grass") and aggressive premeditated major corruption ("eating meat").

The term "Grass Eaters" is used to describe  police officers who "accept gratuities and solicit five, ten, twenty dollar payments from contractors, tow-truck operators, gamblers, and the like but do not pursue corruption payments". "Grass eating" is something that a significant number of officers are guilty of, but which they learned to do from other cops or from imitating the deviants they watch and investigate every day. The commission even concluded that "grass eating" was used by police officers in New York City to prove their loyalty to the brotherhood, and with that came incentives like side jobs. One method of preventing cops from becoming corrupt is to eliminate this step by removing veteran cops who do this; without any veteran cops to learn this from, new officers might decide to never "eat grass".

"Meat Eaters" are officers who "spend a good deal of time aggressively looking for situations they can exploit for financial gain". An example of this is shaking down pimps and illicit drug dealers for money, not only for the material profit to the officers, but for the relief from guilt that the officers derive by convincing themselves that their victims deserve such treatment. They justify taking advantage of these kinds of criminals because they are considered the dregs of society.

See also
 Serpico
 Mollen Commission
 Royal Commission into the New South Wales Police Service in Australia, held from 1994 to 1997
 Police corruption
 Political corruption
 Police brutality
 New York City Police Commissioner
 New York City Police Department corruption and misconduct

Further reading
 Armstrong, M. (2012). They Wished They Were Honest: The Knapp Commission and New York City Police Corruption. New York: Columbia University Press 
 Barker, T. (1978). An Empirical Study of Police Deviance Other Than Corruption. Journal of Police Science and Administration 6(3): 264-72.
 Barker, T. & D. Carter (1990). Fluffing Up the Evidence and Covering Your Ass: Some Conceptual Notes on Police Lying. Deviant Behavior 11: 61-73.
 Barker, T. & D. Carter (Eds.) (1994). Police Deviance. Cincinnati: Anderson. 
 Braziller, G. (Ed.) (1972). The Knapp Commission Report on Police Corruption. New York: George Braziller. 
 Chin, G. (Ed.) (1997) New York City Police Corruption Investigation Commissions. New York: William S. Hein & Co. 
 Chin, G. and Scott Wells, The "Blue Wall of Silence" as Evidence of Bias and Motive to Lie: A New Approach to Police Perjury, 59 University of Pittsburgh Law Review 233 (1998).
 DeLattre, E. (5th ed. 2006) Character and Cops: Ethics in Policing. Washington DC: AEI Press. 
 Dershowitz, A. (1996). Reasonable Doubts. New York: Simon & Schuster.
 Kania, R. & W. Mackey (1977). Police Violence as a Function of Community Characteristics Criminology 15: 27-48.
 Kappeler, V., R. Sluder & G. Alpert (1994). Forces of Deviance: Understanding the Dark Side of Policing. Prospect Heights, IL: Waveland Press.
 Kleinig, J. (1996) The Ethics of Policing. New York: Cambridge Univ. Press.
 Knapp Commission Records, Lloyd Sealy Library Special Collections, John Jay College of Criminal Justice (view upon appointment only)
 Robert Daley (1973). Target Blue, An Insider's View of the N.Y.P.D. New York: Delacorte Press.
 Sherman, L. (1974). Police Corruption: A Sociological Perspective. Garden City, NJ: Doubleday.
 Trautman, N. (1997). The Cutting Edge of Police Integrity. FL: Ethics Inst.

References

External links 
 Official Frank Serpico website
 
 Lloyd Sealy Library Special Collections, John Jay College of Criminal Justice (houses Knapp Commission records, view upon appointment)
 Audio from The Knapp Commission Hearings at the WNYC Archives site courtesy of the Lloyd Sealy Library Special Collection at John Jay College of Criminal Justice.

New York City Police Department corruption and misconduct
1970 establishments in New York City